Leon Gravette Blevins (June 25, 1926 – September 2, 1987) was an American basketball player and coach.

College career
He played collegiately for the University of Arizona after two seasons at Phoenix College, where he scored over 1000 points.

Professional career
He was selected by the Indianapolis Olympians in the 7th round of the 1950 NBA draft and signed with them during the summer.

He played for the Olympians (1950–51) in the NBA for 2 games before being waived by the club in middle of November. On November 23, he signed with the Grand Rapids Hornets of the National Professional Basketball League and played 13 games with the team until it folded in late December. Later, he played with Funk Jewelers in the Phoenix Metropolitan Division.

Coaching career
In 1951, Blevins started his coaching career after being hired as the head coach of Yuma High School.

References

External links

1926 births
1987 deaths
American men's basketball players
Arizona Wildcats men's basketball players
Basketball players from Arizona
Guards (basketball)
Indianapolis Olympians draft picks
Indianapolis Olympians players
Phoenix Bears men's basketball players
People from Craighead County, Arkansas